The Journal of Materials Chemistry A is a weekly peer-reviewed scientific journal that covers the synthesis, properties, and applications of novel materials related to energy and sustainability. It is one of three journals created after the Journal of Materials Chemistry was split at the end of 2012. Its first issue was published in January 2013. The journal is published by the Royal Society of Chemistry and has two sister journals, Journal of Materials Chemistry B and Journal of Materials Chemistry C, which cover different materials science topics. The editor-in-chief for the Journal of Materials Chemistry family of journals is currently Nazario Martin. The deputy editor-in-chief for Journal of Materials Chemistry A is Anders Hagfeldt, while the executive editor is Michaela Mühlberg.

Abstracting and indexing 
The journal is abstracted and indexed in the Science Citation Index Expanded, Current Contents/Physical, Chemical & Earth Sciences, and Current Contents/Engineering, Computing & Technology.

See also 
 List of scientific journals in chemistry
 Materials Horizons
 Journal of Materials Chemistry B
 Journal of Materials Chemistry C
 Soft Matter

References

External links 
 

Chemistry journals
Materials science journals
Royal Society of Chemistry academic journals
Publications established in 2013
English-language journals
Weekly journals